Mattia Tarozzi (born January 15, 1991) is a Grand Prix motorcycle racer from Italy.

Career statistics

By season

Races by year

References

External links

Italian motorcycle racers
Living people
1991 births
125cc World Championship riders
Moto2 World Championship riders
People from Faenza
Sportspeople from the Province of Ravenna